The Japanese pavilion houses Japan's national representation during the Venice Biennale arts festivals.

Background

Organization and building 

The pavilion, designed by Takamasa Yoshizaka, was built between 1955 and 1956.

Representation by year

Art 

 1952 — Taikan Yokoyama, Kokei Kobayashi, Kiyotaka Kaburaki, Heihachirō Fukuda, Kyujin Yamamoto, Kenji Yoshioka, Sotaro Yasui, Shinsen Tokuoka, Ryuzaburo Umehara, Ichiro Fukuzawa, Kigai Kawaguchi
 1954 — Hanjiro Sakamoto, Taro Okamoto
 1956 — Kunitaro Suda, Kazu Wakita, Takeo Yamaguchi, Shigeru Ueki, Toyoichi Yamamoto, Shiko Munakata
 1958 — Ichirō Fukuzawa, Kawabata Ryūshi, Seison Maeda, Kenzo Okada, Yoshi Kinouchi, Shindō Tsuji  (representative: Shūzō Takiguchi; assistant commissioner: Ichirō Fukuzawa and Yoshiaki Tōno)
 1960 — Toshimitsu Imai, Yoshishige Saito, Kei Sato, Kaoru Yamaguchi, Tadahiro Ono, Tomonori Toyofuku, Yoshitatsu Yanagihara, Yozo Hamaguchi
 1962 — Kinuko Emi, Minoru Kawabata, Kumi Sugai, Tadashi Sugimata, Ryokichi Mukai
 1964 — Yoshishige Saito, Toshinobu Onosato, Hisao Domoto, Tomonori Toyofuku
 1966 — Toshinobu Onosato, Masuo Ikeda, Morio Shinoda, Ay-O
 1968 — Tomio Miki, Kumi Sugai, Jiro Takamatsu, Katsuhiro Yamaguchi
 1970 — Shusaku Arakawa and Nobuo Sekine
 1972 — Kenji Usami, Shintaro Tanaka
 1976 — Kishin Shinoyama
 1978 — Koji Enokura, Kishio Suga
 1980 — Koji Enokura, Susumu Koshimizu, Isamu Wakabayashi
 1982 — Naoyoshi Hikosaka, Yoshio Kitayama, Tadashi Kawamata
 1984 — Kosho Ito, Kyoji Takubo, Kosai Hori
 1986 — Isamu Wakabayashi, Masafumi Maita
 1988 — Shigeo Toya, Keiji Umematsu, Katsura Funakoshi
 1990 — Toshikatsu Endo, Saburo Muraoka
 1993 — Yayoi Kusama (Commissioner: Akira Tatehata)
 1995 — Katsuhiko Hibino, Yoichiro Kawaguchi, Hiroshi Senju, Jae Eun Choi
 1997 — Rei Naito
 2003 — Yutaka Sone, Motohiko Odani
 2005 — Miyako Ishiuchi (Commissioner: Michiko Kasahara)
 2007 — Masao Okabe (Commissioner: Chihiro Minato)
 2009 — Miwa Yanagi (Commissioner: Hiroshi Minamishima)
 2011 — Tabaimo (Commissioner: Yuka Uematsu)
 2013 — Koki Tanaka (Curator: Mika Kuraya)
 2015 — Chiharu Shiota (Curator: Hitoshi Nakano)
 2017 — Takahiro Iwasaki (Curator: Meruro Washida)
 2019 — Motoyuki Shitamichi, Taro Yasuno, Toshiaki Ishikura, Fuminori Nousaku (Curator: Hiroyuki Hattori)
 2022 — Dumb Type

References

Bibliography

Further reading

External links 

 

Japanese contemporary art
National pavilions